Cheng Chi-sen (born 13 July 1926) is a Taiwanese former sports shooter. He competed in the 50 metre pistol event at the 1968 Summer Olympics. He also competed at the 1966 Asian Games.

References

1926 births
Living people
Taiwanese male sport shooters
Olympic shooters of Taiwan
Shooters at the 1968 Summer Olympics
People from Enping
Shooters at the 1966 Asian Games
Taiwanese people from Guangdong
Asian Games competitors for Chinese Taipei
20th-century Taiwanese people